Licorice Pizza is a 2021 American coming-of-age comedy-drama film written and directed by Paul Thomas Anderson, who also serves as one of the film's producers and cinematographers. The film stars Alana Haim and Cooper Hoffman in their film debuts, Sean Penn, Tom Waits, Bradley Cooper, and Benny Safdie.

The film was released in the United States in select theaters on November 26, 2021, and was widely released on December 25, 2021.

Licorice Pizza received universal critical acclaim for Anderson's screenplay and direction, Jurgensen's editing and the performances of Haim and Cooper. It was selected by the American Film Institute as one of its ten Movies of the Year. National Board of Review named the film the Best Film of the Year, with Anderson winning Best Director. The film garnered three nominations at the 94th Academy Awards, including Best Picture, and four nominations at the 79th Golden Globe Awards including Best Motion Picture – Musical or Comedy, Best Actress – Motion Picture Musical or Comedy for Haim and Best Director. At the 28th Screen Actors Guild Awards Cooper was nominated for Outstanding Performance by a Male Actor in a Supporting Role. It received eight nominations at the 27th Critics' Choice Awards including Best Picture, Best Director, Best Actress, Best Original Screenplay and Best Editing, where it won Best Comedy, as well as five nominations at the 75th British Academy Film Awards including Best Film, Best Direction, Best Actress in a Leading Role and Best Original Screenplay, the latter of which it won. It is also MGM's first fully produced, marketed and distributed film to be nominated for Best Picture in 33 years, after 1988's Rain Man.

Accolades

See also 
2021 in film

References

External links
 

Lists of accolades by film